John Quincy Adams (21 December 1874   15 March 1933) was an Austrian genre and portrait painter of American ancestry.

Early life
Adams was born in Vienna on 21 December 1874. His mother was Nina Bleyer and his father was the American opera singer, Charles R. Adams, who performed at the Vienna State Opera from 1867 to 1877. From 1878 to 1890, he lived with his parents in the United States and was being prepared for a career in banking.

In 1891, he became one of the first students to attend a private art school operated by Robert Scheffer. After two years, he enrolled at the Academy of Fine Arts, Vienna, where he studied with Siegmund L'Allemand and August Eisenmenger. This was followed by time in Munich, studying with Carl von Marr and Johann Caspar Herterich. He completed his studies in Paris at the Académie Julian with Jules Laurens and Jean-Joseph Benjamin-Constant. Despite this variety of instructors, the expatriate American painter, James McNeill Whistler, appears to have had the most influence on his style.

Career
In 1903, he became a member of the Vienna Künstlerhaus and began to exhibit there on a regular basis. A minor scandal was created in 1909, when he displayed a group portrait with Dr. Ernst Wertheim performing gynecological surgery. Many works from this period are on display at the Museum of Military History, Vienna. He usually spent his summers at Sankt Gilgen, where he had assembled a pre-cast wooden house from Sweden. It is likely that he associated with the artists at the nearby .

From 1917 to 1931, he often visited the United States and had several successful showings there. From 1930 to 1931, he painted a series of portraits for Yale University. In 1933, he was preparing to attend an exhibition in Pittsburgh, sponsored by the Carnegie Institute, when he fell ill and died at the Auersperg Sanatorium. He was buried at the Vienna Central Cemetery. His works may be seen at the Österreichische Galerie Belvedere and the Vienna Museum, among others.

Personal life
Adams died on 15 March 1933 at the Auersperg Sanatorium in Vienna.

His daughter, Harriet Walderdorff, became a well known hotelier in Salzburg and, in 1963, was elected President of the Austrian Hotel Association. In 1986, she organized a major retrospective of his portraits at the Academy.

Gallery

References

Further reading 
 Heinrich Fuchs: Die österreichischen Maler des 19. Jahrhunderts. Vol.1 A–F. Selbstverlag, Vienna 1972
 
 Margarethe Poch-Kalous: "John Quincy Adams – ein vergessener Wiener Maler". In: Alte und moderne Kunst. 1975, #138
 Nikolaus Schaffer: Wiener Gesellschaft im Portrait. Der Maler John Quincy Adams. (Exhibition catalog), Academy of Fine Arts, 1986. Verlag der Akademie der bildenden Künste, Wien 1986.
 John Quincy Adams @ the Wien Geschichte Wiki

External links 

 Catalogue raisonné of Adams' paintings (work in progress)
 More works by Adams @ ArtNet
 Obituary:  (in Fraktur)

1874 births
1933 deaths
Austrian painters
Austrian portrait painters
Academy of Fine Arts Vienna alumni
Artists from Vienna
Austrian people of American descent
Austro-Hungarian expatriates in the United States